In American football, rushing and passing are the two main methods of advancing the ball down the field. A rush, also known as a running play, generally occurs when the quarterback hands or tosses the ball backwards to the running back, but other players, such as the quarterback, can run with the ball. In the National Football League (NFL), the player who has recorded the most rushing yards for a season is considered the winner of the rushing title for that season. In addition to the NFL rushing champion, league record books recognize the rushing champions of the American Football League (AFL), which operated from 1960 to 1969 before being absorbed into the National Football League in 1970.

The NFL did not begin keeping official records until the 1932 season. Since the adoption of the 14-game season in 1961, all but one rushing champion have recorded over 1,000 yards rushing. Eight rushing champions have recorded over 2,000 rushing yards, a feat first accomplished by O. J. Simpson in 1973 and most recently achieved by Derrick Henry in 2020. 

The player with the most rushing titles is Jim Brown, who was the rushing champion eight times over his career. Eric Dickerson, Emmitt Smith, O. J. Simpson, Steve Van Buren, and Barry Sanders are tied for the second-most rushing titles, each having won four times. Jim Brown also holds the record for the most consecutive rushing titles with five, having led the league in rushing each year from 1957 to 1961. Steve Van Buren, Emmitt Smith, and Earl Campbell each recorded three consecutive rushing titles. The Cleveland Browns have recorded the most rushing titles with eleven; the Dallas Cowboys rank second, with seven rushing titles. The most recent rushing champion is Josh Jacobs of the Las Vegas Raiders, who led the league with 1,656 yards rushing over the 2022 season. Derrick Henry is the most recent player to win back-to-back titles.

In 2022 the NFL announced that, "To permanently honor the impact of Jim Brown on the NFL, the player with the most rushing yards each season will be presented with the "Jim Brown Award". Josh Jacobs was the inaugural recipient.

List of NFL rushing title winners

List of AFL rushing title winners

Most rushing titles

See also
 List of National Football League career rushing yards leaders
 List of NCAA major college football yearly rushing leaders

Notes

References
General

Footnotes

External links
 National Football League
 250 best American Football League (AFL) and NFL rushing seasons

Rushing yards
Rushing
National Football League lists